Bong Tan is a tambon (subdistrict) of Doi Tao District, in the Chiang Mai Province, Thailand. In 2005, it had a population of 4,678. The tambon contains six villages.

References

Tambon of Chiang Mai province
Populated places in Chiang Mai province